WeFinance is a technology-enabled platform headquartered in San Francisco, which connects lenders with borrowers. The platform allows borrowers to pick their own interest rate, length, and other terms. Typical loans are non-restrictive and can be used for educational expenses, tuition refinancing, coding bootcamps, or moving.

The platform is compared to Kiva or Kickstarter since it focuses on stories and relationships over credit scores.

In 2016, WeFinance partnered with Reactor Core, the parent company of Hack Reactor and MakerSquare, to create a platform where graduates can lend to incoming students.

WeFinance has raised capital from 500 Startups, Stanford's StartX, and Graph Ventures.

References

Companies based in San Francisco
Privately held companies of the United States
Online financial services companies of the United States
Financial services companies based in California
Crowdfunding platforms of the United States